Oliver De Lancey may refer to: 
 Oliver De Lancey (American loyalist) (1718–1785), merchant, New York Loyalist politician and Major-general during the American War of Independence
 Oliver De Lancey (British Army officer, died 1822) (c. 1749–1822), British Army officer who took part in the American War of Independence and the French Revolutionary Wars
 Oliver De Lancey (British Army and Spanish Legion officer) (1803–1837), British Army officer, volunteered for Spanish Legion and died fighting in Spain during the First Carlist War